Hadwin's Judgement is a Canadian documentary film, released in 2015. Directed by Sasha Snow and based in part on John Vaillant's 2004 book The Golden Spruce, the film is about Grant Hadwin, the logger  who protested logging company practices by cutting down the sacred Kiidk'yaas in 1997.  The film also includes some docudrama elements, in which Hadwin is portrayed by actor Doug Chapman.

Reception
The film premiered in April 2015 at the Hot Docs Canadian International Documentary Festival. In February 2016, it was named Best Canadian film at the Vancouver International Mountain Film Festival.

The film received two Canadian Screen Award nominations at the 4th Canadian Screen Awards in 2016, in the categories of Best Feature Length Documentary and Best Cinematography in a Documentary.

References

External links
 

2015 films
2015 documentary films
Canadian docudrama films
National Film Board of Canada documentaries
Documentary films about forests and trees
Documentary films about terrorism
Films set in British Columbia
Eco-terrorism
Films about lumberjacks
Films produced by David Christensen
2010s English-language films
2010s Canadian films